The 1987 Montana State Bobcats football team was an American football team that represented Montana State University in the Big Sky Conference during the 1987 NCAA Division I-AA football season. In their first season under head coach Earle Solomonson, the Bobcats compiled a 1–10 record (0–8 against Big Sky opponents) and finished last in the Big Sky.

Schedule

References

Montana State
Montana State Bobcats football seasons
Montana State Bobcats football